Walter Leo Whalen (February 14, 1898 – April 7, 1966) was an American track and field athlete who competed in the 1920 Summer Olympics. In 1920 he finished fourth in the high jump competition.

References

External links
list of American athletes

1898 births
1966 deaths
American male high jumpers
Olympic track and field athletes of the United States
Athletes (track and field) at the 1920 Summer Olympics